Christianity is a minority religion in Malaysia. In the 2020 census, 9.1% of the Malaysian population identified themselves as Christians. About two-thirds of Malaysia's Christian population lives in East Malaysia, in the states of Sabah and Sarawak. Adherents of Christianity represent majority (50.1%) of the population in Sarawak, which is Malaysia's largest state by land area.  The major Christian denominations in Malaysia include Roman Catholics, Anglicans, Baptists, Brethren, non-denominational churches, independent Charismatic churches, Lutherans, Methodists, and Presbyterians.

History
Early Christian presence in the Malay archipelago can be traced to Arab Christian traders from the Arabian Peninsula who heard the gospel from Peter the apostle at Jerusalem (Acts 2:11), as well as those evangelized by Paul's ministry in Arabia (Galatians 1:17) and the evangelistic ministry of St Thomas to the early Arabians and Nestorians from as early as the 7th century and to early Arab Christian, Persian and Nestorian traders in Malacca prior to the Portuguese conquest in 1511. The British acquired Penang in 1786, and in 1795 took over Malacca, which had been conquered by the Dutch in 1641. Catholic priests from Thailand established the Major Seminary in Penang in 1810. The LMS was based in Malacca and Penang from 1815, but most Protestant missions collapsed after 1842 when it became possible to enter China. Catholic leadership remained, but was divided between Portuguese and French. Open Brethren ministry dates from 1860 and Methodist from 1885. Presbyterianism grew through Chinese churches in Johore and expatriate congregations in Penang, Ipoh and Kuala Lumpur. Mission to Sengoi indigenous people began in 1932. Pentecostalism became a larger influence through the Charismatic Movement of the 1970s, but North American and Ceylon Pentecostal Mission missionaries (Pentecostal Church of Malaysia) had been active from 1935.

Anglicanism and Roman Catholicism came to North Borneo in 1882 after the establishment of British North Borneo. The missionary movement, for example the Roman Catholic Mill Hill Missionaries, focused mainly on the Chinese and indigenous communities, such as the Kadazan-Dusun people. Migration was also an important factor in the spread of Christianity. The Basel Mission also worked in Sabah in 1882 among migrant Hakka Chinese, many of whom were Christian. Tamil migrants to Malaya included Catholics, Lutherans, Anglicans, and Methodists. Migration increased after the Boxer Rebellion, particularly to Sitiawan and Sibu, still strong Chinese Methodist centres. Mar Thoma and Syriac Orthodox Churches were established in the 1930s following migration from the Kerala Coast of India.

In Sarawak the rule of Rajah Brooke included support for an Anglican ministry from 1847 and Catholics were later admitted. In 1928 the Australian Borneo Evangelical Mission began work with modest resources which nevertheless resulted in the largest indigenous church in Malaysia today, the Sidang Injil Borneo (Borneo Evangelical Church).

World War II saw the removal of expatriate leadership and a path towards an indigenous church was more clearly set. The Malayan Christian Council (MCC), founded in 1948, coordinated mission groups during the Malayan Emergency. Chinese relocated into 'New Villages' were served by missionaries, sometimes ex-China, who worked alongside local Christians in social and medical work. However, after independence in 1957, many churches were overdependent on expatriates. In the 1970s churches developed structures independent of Singapore as well as of overseas support. Recent growth in independent churches is another sign of a desire to establish a Malaysian Christian identity.

Christian commitment to education has been strong through Anglican, Catholic and Methodist schools, now part of the government education system. Social concern is expressed through medical work, and organisations such as Malaysian CARE. The Salvation Army and YMCA/YWCAs make distinctive contributions.

Since 1983 the National Evangelical Christian Fellowship (NECF) has provided a focus for evangelical and independent congregations. The Christian Federation of Malaysia incorporating the Christian Council of Malaysia (formerly MCC), Roman Catholics, and the NECF was formed in 1986. The Sabah Council of Churches and Association of Churches of Sarawak fulfil similar functions in East Malaysia.

Malaysia is a multi-religious context where Western theological preoccupations are not always relevant. Lay leadership has developed strongly in most churches. Although there are many challenges through changing political and economic circumstances, like Malaysia itself, the churches are beginning to see that they have a contribution to make on a larger stage.

Church buildings

Churches are allowed in Malaysia, though there are restrictions on construction of new churches through discriminatory zoning laws. No pre-existing churches have been closed down by the government and no standing congregations have been disbanded. However, it is difficult to build new churches. For instance, it took more than twenty years for the local council in Shah Alam to allow a church to be built there, with an additional condition that the church must look like a factory and not a more conventional church appearance. Most of the time, new churches are started in a clandestine manner as ordinary businesses in shops, especially in major cities like Kuala Lumpur.

Some of Malaysia's notable current churches include St. John's Cathedral in Kuala Lumpur, St. Joseph's Cathedral in Kuching, Sacred Heart Cathedral in Kota Kinabalu, St. Michael's Church in Penampang and Christ Church in Malacca City.

Evangelism

The freedom to practice and propagate religion is guaranteed under the Article 11 of the Constitution of Malaysia and this is generally respected. The Constitution however allows for the restriction of the propagation of religions other than Islam to the Muslim community and the ambiguity of these provisions has resulted in some problems.

It has been the practice of the church in Malaysia to not actively proselytise to the Muslim community. Christian literature are required by law to carry a caption "for non-Muslims only". Article 11(4) of the Federal Constitution of Malaysia allows the states to prohibit the propagation of other religions to Muslims, and most (with the exception of Penang, Sabah, Sarawak and the Federal Territories) have done so. There is no well researched agreement on the actual number of Malaysian Muslim converts to Christianity in Malaysia. According to the latest population census released by the Malaysian Statistics Department, there are none, according to Ustaz Ridhuan Tee, there are 135 and according to Tan Sri Dr Harussani Zakaria, there are 260,000. See also Status of religious freedom in Malaysia.

There are, however, cases in which a Muslim will adopt the Christian faith without declaring his/her apostasy (in the eyes of Islamic authorities) openly. In effect, they are practising Christians, but legally Muslims.

Muslims showing interest in the Christian faith or other faith practices not considered orthodox by state religious authorities are usually sent either by the police or their family members to state funded Faith Rehabilitation Centres where they are counselled to remain faithful to Islam and some states have provisions for penalties under their respective Shariah legislations for apostasy from Islam.

Bible translation and literature

Portions of the Bible had been translated into the Malay language as early as 1612 and was published in the Netherlands in 1629. The Malay language was one of the first Eastern Asian languages to have the Bible translated. Due to the linguistic and cultural similarities of both Malaysia and Indonesia, a lot of early language and literature work was shared by the two territories and the legacy remains today.

As a Muslim majority country, opinions on whether the Indonesian-language Bible and Malay-language Bible, both known by the name Alkitab, should be banned, are polarised. The word rendered 'Lord' in English translations is given in Malay as 'Tuhan' while the word 'God' in English is translated as 'Allah'. It was claimed that there is no closer translation from the original Hebrew since both Arabic and the Hebrew word for God come from the same Semitic root, and Arabic-speaking Christians and Maltese-speaking Christians also use the word 'Allah' for God.

Other Christian materials in the Malay language have been banned at various times for similar reason. However, the Prime Minister clarified in April 2005 that there was no ban on Bibles translated into Malay, although they are required to be stamped with a disclaimer "Not for Muslims".

A lawsuit was filed by the Roman Catholic Archdiocese of Kuala Lumpur against the Government of Malaysia at the High Court of Malaya to seek a declaratory relief that the archdiocesan newspaper, The Herald, was entitled to use the word Allah and that the word should not exclusive to Islam.

The Iban Bible named Bup Kudus was also banned for using the term Allah Taala for God. Eventually, it was explained to the government that there was no other comparable term in Iban. As such, the ban was not enforced further, although neither was it officially repealed. The ban was later lifted only for usage by the Iban people, after protests from various Christian leaders.

Education
Christian Missionary schools are part of education system in Malaysia today and administered by Ministry of Education with little interference by the churches where they belong to. Missionary schools are partially government-funded while teachers and administration staff are provided by the government. Most of the missionary schools were constructed before Malaysia was formed. Christian religious symbols such as crucifixes are visible to many Christian missionary schools. However, display of crucifixes to non-missionary schools are normally disallowed.

There are no official school subjects for Christian students. However, Christian and other non-Muslim students are allowed to take Bible Knowledge subject, the only Christian-related subject in SPM (Sijil Pelajaran Malaysia or Malaysia Certificate of Education) for secondary school. There are various non-official Christian school subjects, but it mostly caters for Christians and non-Muslims.

Music
There are many Christian songwriters in Malaysia, but the market is still fresh and not widespread. A network called the Malaysian Christian Songwriters Network, has been set up to promote the Malaysian Christian music scene.

Films
Mel Gibson's 2004 film The Passion of The Christ saw a restricted release in Malaysia. Officially, the movie was open to Christians only. Attendance was discouraged since tickets were not carried by the usual box offices. Christian groups such as the National Evangelical Christian Fellowship arranged block bookings of cinemas and distributed tickets to various churches. An initial run of two-months was extended, making it appear doubtful that only Christians viewed the film.

Activities

Actual modes of worship such as the liturgy used and the sermons are not actively censored or controlled by the government. Occasional surveillance of worship by clandestine operatives does occur.

It has been reported that several public secondary schools and universities have unofficially banned on-campus Christian activities, such as Christian Fellowship (CF).

Holidays

Christmas
Christmas is a public holiday in Malaysia, though much of the public celebration is commercial in nature and has no overt religious overtones. Occasionally, Christians do buy newspaper adverts on Christmas or Easter, but this is largely only allowed in English-language newspapers and permission is not given every year. The adverts themselves are usually indirect statements.

In 2004 the government organised a national-level Christmas celebration but allegedly imposed an unofficial ban on all Christian religious symbols and hymns that specifically mention Jesus Christ. The event was jointly organised by the Arts, Culture and Heritage ministry, the government of the state of Selangor and the Christian Federation of Malaysia (CFM). It was reported in advance that the Prime Minister, the Sultan of Selangor and his consort, as well as assorted cabinet ministers would be in attendance, and that the event would be televised.

O.C. Lim, a former lawyer turned Jesuit priest and director of the Catholic Research Centre (also assistant parish priest of St Francis Xavier's Church) lodged a formal complaint. He also stated that "To exclude (such) carols and to use (Christmas) for political gain is outrageous, scandalous and sacrilegious." He also said "To call it a cultural event (as rationalised by Christian politicians who are more politician than Christian) is to downgrade Jesus to a cultural sage such as Confucius."

CFM general secretary Rev. Dr. Hermen Shastri stated that the government wanted "nothing that insults Islam" during the open house.

Arts, Culture and Heritage Minister Dr Rais Yatim later denied that any such ban had been "issued officially or unofficially". He also added that there is "nothing wrong in singing songs such as 'Silent Night' and 'Merry Christmas'" as they are "joyous songs for the festival."

Lee Min Choon, legal adviser to the CFM and the National Evangelical Christian Fellowship issued a statement which said "It means that churches can celebrate Christmas as they have been doing all along. Otherwise, the very meaning of the occasion will be lost." "Now, everybody should take the government at its word and celebrate Christmas the way they normally celebrate and express their religious faith."

Good Friday
Good Friday is not a federal public holiday, but is a state public holiday in Sabah, and also in Sarawak, where Christianity is the largest religion; both states were granted some level of greater autonomy than other states in the Federation, as they were considered polities on par with Malaya when they merged with it and Singapore to form Malaysia. But it is a school holiday for some schools (or specifically, non-Muslim-majority schools).

However, there is no evidence that this theological objection plays any role in the non-inclusion of Good Friday as a holiday. On the contrary, Good Friday is probably not a public holiday because, as a whole in the federation, Christians constitutes 9.2% of the population according to the 2010 Census. The other two significant religious minorities in Malaysia, Buddhists and Hindus, also receive just one federal public holiday each – Wesak Day and Deepavali respectively. Deepavali however, is not federal holiday in the state of Sarawak.

Independence Day/Malaysia Day fasting
Malaysian Christians sometimes hold fasts ending on Independence Day or Malaysia Day and pray for Muslims. A number of explanations have been given for doing so including a desire to show patriotism, promoting religious harmony, and celebrating freedom of religion. Since 2000 the National Evangelical Christian Fellowship, with 2,800 member churches, has organised these fasts and they are ongoing event as of 2010. All previous fasts have ended on Independence Day but the 2010 fast was followed by Malaysia Day and thus for the first time coincided with Ramadan.

Distribution of Christians

According to the 2010 Census, there were 2,951,159 people self-identifying as Christians (11.2% of the population). Of the Christians, 1,878,193 were Bumiputra, 726,479 were Chinese, 134,281 were Indian, 23,871 Others and 264,336 were non-citizens. Information collected in the census based on respondent's answer and did not refer to any official document.

By gender
The 2010 Population and Housing Census Report gives the following statistics:

By ethnic group

By state or federal territory
The 2010 Population and Housing Census Report gives the following statistics (excluding non-citizens).

By urban-rural strata
The 2000 Population and Housing Census Report indicates that approximately 11.5% of the rural population and 7.6% of the urban population are adherents to Christianity making Christians the 2nd largest and 4th largest faith community in their respective population strata.

See also

Roman Catholicism in Malaysia
Status of religious freedom in Malaysia

References

External links

 A Bibliography of Christianity in Malaysia
 The Centre for the Study of Christianity in Asia

 
Religion in Malaysia